The Moscow Grooves Institute is a Russian electronic musical project by Arkady Martinenko of Megapolis (band), Heat of the Earth and the Eject Project, and Boris Nazarov.

History
MGI was created in 1995 by Moscow musicians Arkady Martinenko of Megapolis, Heat of the Earth and the Eject Project, and Boris Nazarov. Together with the "Ministry of Psycho" project, MGI played a number of live electronic concerts for the independent experimental radio station "Substation". These concerts paved the way for the project's first studio album, Surround Wednesday, released by independent label Citadel Records in 1997.

Over the next fourteen years, the band performed in France, Germany, Monaco, Poland, Romania, Ukraine, Lithuania, Latvia, and Japan. They also took part in a number of international music festivals, including Kazantip (Ukraine), Subtropique (Georgia), Popkomm (Germany), Grimaldi Forum (France), Nu Jazz, NOKIA Lab (Russia), and MIDEM (France).

The band's third member, Sergei Belyaev joined in late 1998. He participated in the recording of MGI's second album, Pizza. The musical style of this album was funk with elements of drum-n-base and ethnic trip hop. The Moscow Grooves Institute also invited Sergei Klevensky and the members of the Detsky Panadol project to take part in the recording of the album.

In 2000, MGI released a new album, Commercial and also filmed four videos for the compositions “Stereophonique”, “Voyage”, “2 professors”, and “Dancing”. Later videos included “Les Chrysanthemes” (2001) and “Na Zare” (2003). The videos have been shown on MTV Russia, Muz-TV, Music Box, A One, and O2TV as well as on Ukrainian and Belorussian musical channels. In 2001, MGI joined with the Mummy Troll» to record a version of Victor Zoy's song “Malysh”, which remained at number one on Radio Maximum's music chart for several months.

In June 2002, MGI released their new album Tangibility.  Such well known foreign labels as Netlmage Foundation (Great Britain) and MPLS. Ltd (USA) released vinyl singles from the album.

The project's fifth studio album, Les Etoiles Sont Plus Proches Avec Les Yeux Fermes was released in April 2006, although it had been in preparation since 2003. Olga Noel contributed to the backing vocals on this album, along with MC Chevy of German rap band N.O.H.A., and Daria Rodcher.

The MGI project reached the finals of several international electronic music contests. Their tracks are often included in music compilations issued by such foreign record companies as Pork Recordings, George V, Les Maquis, Pschent, and Petrol Records.

Arkady Martinenko and Boris Nazarov wrote the musical scores to the films Native and IDtimate (2007) and Dance, Don’t Stop (2007), directed by E. Lavrentiev. They have worked on the remixes of compositions by t.A.T.u., Vitas, Mummy Troll, Enrique Iglesias, and Alsou, and have composed music for TV advertisements.

In 2007, Citadel Records released a multi-color version of the Moscow Grooves Institute's debut album Surround Wednesday, partly rearranged by sound producer Sofia Kruglikova. In 2009 a performance by Moscow Grooves Institute and Olga Noel opened the concert program of the forty third MIDEM. They are currently working on a sixth studio album.

Line-up

Boris Nazarov
Nazarov is one of founders, and the only constant member, of the Moscow Grooves Institute. He has collaborated with actor and director Mikhail Efremov, writing music for Andrei Platonov's play Musical Box, when it was performed at Moscow's Sovremennik Theatre. He has also worked with the "Levitation" program, with Tony Levin and members of the Goatika Creative Laboratory).

Pavel Khotin
Khotin is the group's keyboard player.  From 1984 to 1990, he was a member of underground art-punk group “Zvuki Mu”, produced by Brian Eno. Between 1991 and 1995, he participated in the project MD&C Pavlov, the winners of “Generation 94” contest. From 1996 to 1997, he was an art director for the  “Water Area” club. In 1998, he was a musical co-producer of Cosmos Production label, and from 1996 till 2004 was also a participant in the "Tetris" electronic project, whose albums were related by British label Pork Recordings. Since 2005, Khotin has played in the group "Reunion Nikolai Kopernik", and more recently, he has also collaborated with Papa Z–Trio, released by New York label Bagpak Music.

Yuri Shulgin
Shulgin is a disk jockey, musician, and bass guitar player. He performed his first DJ set in 2004 and, as a bass guitar player, became the member of Papa Z–Trio. Yuri later collaborated with Iscra Disco. In 2008, he was heralded as the best scratch DJ at the international festival “Doors to the summer”, held in Yaroslavl. Shulgin combines jazz, funk, hip-hop, and turntablism in his music.

Discography
2007 - Surround Wednesday, multicolor version (Citadel Records)
2006 - Les Etoiles Sont Plus Proches Avec Les Yeux Fermes (Citadel Records)
2002 - Tangibility (Citadel Records)
2001 - Pizza (Citadel Records)
2000 - Commercial - limited edition (Citadel Records)
2001 - Commercial - unlimited edition (Citadel Records)
2000 - Surround Wednesday, сolour version (Citadel Records)
1997 - Surround Wednesday (demo tape)

With Olga Rozdestvenskaya
2004 - Na Zare (Citadel Records)
2003 - OLF - Les Chrisanthemes (Citadel Records)

References

External links
Moscow Grooves Institute official web-site
Moscow Grooves Institute on MySpace
Moscow Grooves Institute on Virb.com

Russian electronic musicians